Henryk Szatkowski was one of the leaders of the Nazi German Goralenvolk action in the Podhale region of occupied Poland during World War II. A self-proclaimed Volksdeutscher ("ethnic German"), he was a sports and tourism activist in Zakopane from before the invasion. Szatkowski collaborated with the Nazis, worked as an informer, and promoted the failed Goralische Freiwilligen SS Legion. According to at least one modern day account he was blackmailed. However, Polish historian Jan Berghauzen suspects him of being a well established spy in Zakopane working for German intelligence service.

Szatkowski fled from Podhale with the retreating Nazis at the end of World War II, never to be heard from again. He left behind wife Maria and children.

Notes and references

Nonpartisan Bloc for Cooperation with the Government politicians
Camp of National Unity politicians
Polish Gorals
Possibly living people

Volksdeutsche